Pakistan has, over its 60-year history, issued over 600 issues and 1,100 stamps and souvenir sheets.

 1947 to 1966
 1967 to 1976
 1977 to 1986
 1987 to 1996
 1997 to 2006
 2007 to 2016
 2017 to present

1967
 International Tourist Year – 1 January 1967
  One stamp was issued on this occasion 
  Value: 15 Paisa 
 Tuberculosis Eradication Campaign – 10 January 1967
  One stamp was issued on this occasion 
  Value: 15 Paisa
 Fourth National Scout Jamboree – 29 January 1967
  One stamp was issued on this occasion 
  Value: 15 Paisa
 Centenary of West Pakistan High Court 17 February
  One stamp was issued on this occasion 
  Value: 15 Paisa
 Allama Muhammad Iqbal Commemoration – 21 April 1967
  Two stamps were issued on this occasion 
  Values: 15 Paisa & Rs. 1
 Award of Hillal-I-Istiqlal – 15 May 1967
  One stamp was issued on this occasion 
  Value: 15 Paisa
 20th Anniversary of Independence – 14 August 1967
  One stamp was issued on this occasion 
  Value: 15 Paisa
 Pakistan Major Exports – 26 September 1967
  Three stamps were issued on this occasion 
  Values: 10 Paisa, 15 Paisa & 50 Paisa
 Universal Children's Day – 2 October 1967
  One stamp was issued on this occasion 
  Value: 15 Paisa
 1967 Coronation of Shah of Iran – 26 October 1967
  One stamp was issued on this occasion 
  Value: 50 Paisa
 Co-Operative Day – 4 November 1967
  One stamp was issued on this occasion 
  Value: 15 Paisa 
 Indus Basin Project – 23 November 1967
  One stamp was issued on this occasion 
  Value: 15 Paisa
 The Fight Against Cancer – 26 December 1967
  One stamp was issued on this occasion 
  Value: 15 Paisa

1968
 International Human Rights – 31 January 1968
  Two stamps were issued on this occasion 
  Values: 15 Paisa, 50 Paisa
 First Convocation of East Pakistan Agricultural University – 28 March 1968
  One stamp was issued on this occasion 
  Value: 15 Paisa
 20th Anniversary of W.H.O. – 7 April 1968
  Two stamps were issued on this occasion 
  Values: 15 Paisa, 50 Paisa
 Nazar-ul-Islam Commemoration – 25 June 1968
  Two stamps were issued on this occasion 
  Values: 15 Paisa, 50 Paisa
  The first with a two-line inscription set was issued but it was withdrawn for having the wrong date
 1968–1969 Surcharged Stamps ( Surcharged by typography) – 18 July 1968
  Four stamps were overprinted Surcharge on this occasion 
  Values: 4 Paisa was overprinted on the 3a stamp Plane & Watch of 14 August 1951; 4 Paisa was overprinted on the 6a stamp Textile Mill of 14 August 1955; 60 Paisa was overprinted on the 10a stamp Archway & Lamp of 14 August 1951 in red ink; 60 Paisa was overprinted on the 10a stamp Archway & Lamp of 14 August 1951 in black ink
 1968 Universal Children’s Day – 7 October 1968
  One stamp was issued on this occasion 
  Value: 15 Paisa
 1968 Decade of Development – 27 October 1968
 Four stamps were issued on this occasion 
 Values: 10 Paisa, 15 Paisa, 50 Paisa & 60 Paisa

1969
 Pakistan’s First Steel Mill at Chittagong – 7 January 1969
  One stamp was issued on this occasion 
  Value:  15 Paisa,
 Family Planning – 14 January 1969
  One stamp was issued on this occasion 
  Value:  15 Paisa,
 Olympic Hockey Champions – 20 January 1969
  Two stamps were issued on this occasion 
  Values: 15 Paisa, Rs. 1
 Centenary of the Death of Mirza Ghalib – 15 February 1969
  Two stamps were issued on this occasion 
  Value: 15 Paisa, 50 Paisa 
 New Dacca Railway Station – 27 April 1969
  One stamp was issued on this occasion 
  Value:  15 Paisa,
 50th Anniversary of ILO – 15 May 1969
  Two stamps were issued on this occasion 
  Values: 15 Paisa, 50 Paisa
 5th Anniversary of R.C.D. – 21 July 1969
  Three stamps were issued on this occasion 
  Values: 20 Paisa, 50 Paisa, and Rs. 1
 First Oil Refinery in East Pakistan – 15 September 1969
  One stamp was issued on this occasion 
  Value:  20 Paisa,
 Universal Children's Day – 6 October 1969
  One stamp was issued on this occasion 
  Value:  20 Paisa,
 Inauguration of P.I.A. Peal Route, Dhaka –Tokyo – 1 November 1969
  Two stamps were issued on this occasion 
  Values: 20 Paisa, 50 Paisa   
 1969 –11 1000th Anniversary of Ibn-al-Haitham – 4 November 1969
  One stamp was issued on this occasion 
  Value:  20 Paisa,  
 50th Anniversary of 1st England-Australia Flight – 2 December 1969
  One stamp was issued on this occasion 
  Value:  50 Paisa,

1970
World Fair Osaka Expo – 70 – 15 March 1970
  One stamp was issued on this occasion 
  Value:  50 Paisa,
 New U.P.U. Headquarters – 20 May 1970
  Two stamps were issued on this occasion 
  Values: 20 Paisa, 50 Paisa,
 25th Anniversary of U.N.O. – 26 June 1970
  Two stamps were issued on this occasion 
  Values: 20 Paisa, 50 Paisa,
 International Education Year – 6 July 1970
  Two stamps were issued on this occasion 
  Values: 20 Paisa, 50 Paisa,
 Sixth Anniversary of R.C.D. – 21 July 1970
  Three stamps were issued on this occasion 
  Value: 20 Paisa, 50 Paisa, Rs. 1
 Asian Productivity Year – 18 August 1970
  One stamp was issued on this occasion 
 Value: 50 Paisa,
 Centenary of the Birth of Dr. Maria Montessori – 31 August 1970
  Two stamps were issued on this occasion 
  Value: 20 Paisa, 50 Paisa,
 10th F.A.O. Conference for the Near East, Islamabad – 12 September 1970
  One stamp was issued on this occasion 
  Value:  20 Paisa,
 Universal Children's Day – 5 October 1970
  One stamp was issued on this occasion 
  Value: 20 Paisa
 National Assembly Elections – 7 December 1970
  One stamp was issued on this occasion 
  Value:  20 Paisa
 Provincial Assembly Elections – 17 December 1970
  One stamp was issued on this occasion 
  Value:  20 Paisa
 Conference of Islamic Foreign Minister, Karachi – 26 December 1970
  One stamp was issued on this occasion 
  Value:  20 Paisa

1971
 Coastal Embankments in East Pakistan – 25 February 1971
  One stamp was issued on this occasion 
  Value: 20 Paisa
 Racial Equality Year – 21 March 1971
  Two stamps were issued on this occasion 
  Values: 20 Paisa, 50 Paisa
 20th Anniversary of Colombo Plan – 1 July 1971
  One stamp was issued on this occasion 
  Value: 20 Paisa
 Seventh Anniversary of R.C.D. – 21 July 1971
  Three stamps were issued on this occasion 
  Value: 20 Paisa, 50 Paisa, 50 Paisa
 Universal Children’s Day– 4 October 1971
  One stamp was issued on this occasion 
88 Value:  20 Paisa

 Universal Postal Union Souvenir Sheet – 9 October 1971
  Pakistan's first Souvenir Sheet was issued on this occasion
  Size 
 Quantity issued: 10,000
  Value: 70 Paisa
 2500th Anniversary of Persian Monarchy – 15 October 1971
  One Souvenir Sheet and three stamps were issued on this occasion
  Second Souvenir Sheet of Pakistan Size  – Quantity issued: 10,000 
  Values: 10 Paisa, 20 Paisa, 50 Paisa and Miniature Sheet 80 Paisa
 World Cup Hockey Tournament – 24 October 1971
 One stamp was issued on this occasion 
 Value: 20 Paisa
 25th Anniversary UNESCO – 4 November 1971
  One stamp was issued on this occasion 
  Value: 20 Paisa
 25th Anniversary of UNICEF – 11 December 1971
 One stamp was issued on this occasion 
 Value:   50 Paisa
 50th Anniversary of Hashemite Kingdom of Jordan – 25 December 1971
 One stamp was issued on this occasion 
 Value: 20 Paisa
 Hockey Championship Victory – 31 December 1971
  One stamp was issued on this occasion 
  Value: 20 Paisa

1972
 International Book Year – 15 January 1972
  One stamp was issued on this occasion 
  Value:  20 Paisa
 UNESCO Campaign to Save Venice – 7 February 1972
  One stamp was issued on this occasion 
  Value:  20 Paisa
 25th Anniversary of ECAFE – 28 March 1972
  One stamp was issued on this occasion 
  Value: 20 Paisa
 World Health Day – 7 April 1972
  One stamp was issued on this occasion 
  Value: 20 Paisa
 U.N. Conference on the Human Environment, Stockholm – 5 June 1972
  One stamp was issued on this occasion 
  Value: 20 Paisa
 Eighth Anniversary of R.C.D. – 21 July 1972
  Three stamps were issued on this occasion 
  Values: 10 Paisa, 20 Paisa, 50 Paisa,
 25th Anniversary of Pakistan Independence – 14 August 1972
  Six stamps were issued on this occasion 
 Values: 20 Paisa ( 4 different stamp designs), 10 Paisa, Paisa 60
 National Blood Transfusion Service – 6 September 1972
  One stamp was issued on this occasion 
  Value: 20 Paisa
 Centenary of Population Census – 16 September 1972
  One stamp was issued on this occasion 
  Value: 20 Paisa
 Universal Children’s Day– 2 October 1972
  One stamp was issued on this occasion 
  Value: 20 Paisa
 Education Week– 23 October 1972
  One stamp was issued on this occasion 
  Value: 20 Paisa
 Inauguration of Karachi Nuclear Power Plant – 28 November 1972
  One stamp was issued on this occasion 
  Value:  20 Paisa

1973
 500th Birth Anniversary of Copernicus– 19 February 1973
  One stamp was issued on this occasion
  Value: 20 Paisa
 50th Anniversary of Mohenjadaro Excavations – 23 February 1973
  One stamp was issued on this occasion
  Value: 20 Paisa
 I.M.O. W.M.O. Centenary – 23 March 1973
  One stamp was issued on this occasion
  Value: 20 Paisa
 Prisoners of War in India – 18 April 1973
  One stamp was issued on this occasion
  Value: Rs. 1.25
 Constitution Week – 21 April 1973
 One stamp was issued on this occasion
 Value: 20 Paisa
 25th Anniversary of State Bank of Pakistan – 1 July 1973
 Two stamps were issued on this occasion
 Values: 20 Paisa, Rs. 1
 Ninth Anniversary of R.C.D. – 21 July 1973
  Three stamp were issued on this occasion 
  Value: 20 Paisa, 60 Paisa, Rs. 1.25
 Independence Day and Enforcement of the Constitution – 14 August 1973
  One stamp was issued on this occasion
  Value: 20 Paisa
 25th Death Anniversary of Quaid-e-Azam – 11 September 1973
 One stamp was issued on this occasion
  Value: 20 Paisa
 Fishes – 24 September 1973
  Four stamp were issued on this occasion
 Values: 10 Paisa, 20 Paisa, 60 Paisa, and Rs. 1
 Universal Children’s Day– 1 October 1973
 One stamp was issued on this occasion
 Value: 20 Paisa
 10th Anniversary of Food Program – 15 October 1973
 One stamp was issued on this occasion
 Value: 20 Paisa
 50th Anniversary of Turkish Republic – 29 October 1973
 One stamp was issued on this occasion
 Value: 50 Paisa
 National Silver Jubilee Scout Jamboree – 11 November 1973
 One stamp was issued on this occasion
 Value: 20 Paisa
 25th Anniversary of Declaration of Human Rights– 16 November 1973
 One stamp was issued on this occasion
 Value:: 20 Paisa
 International Congress of Millennium of Al-Biruni – 26 November 1973
 Two stamp were issued on this occasion
 Values: 20 Paisa, Rs. 1.25
 Centenary of Hansen’s Discovery of Leprosy Bacillus – 29 December 1973
 One stamp was issued on this occasion
 Value: 20 Paisa

1974
 World Population Year – 1 January 1974
 Two stamps were issued on this occasion
 Values: 20 Paisa, Rs. 1.25
 Second Islamic Summit Pakistan – 22 February 1974
 One Souvenir Sheet & Two Stamp were issued on this occasion
 Values: 20 Paisa, 50 Paisa, Souvenir Sheet 85 Paisa
 Introduction of International System of weights and Measures in Pakistan – 1 July 1974
 One stamp was issued on this occasion 
 Value:  20 Paisa
 10th Anniversary of R.C.D. – 21 July 1974
 Three stamps were issued on this occasion 
 Values: 20 Paisa, 60 Paisa, Rs. 1.25
 National Day of Plantation – 9 August 1974
  One stamp was issued on this occasion 
  Value: 20 Paisa
 Namibia Day – 26 August 1974
 One stamp was issued on this occasion 
 Value: 60 Paisa
 Shahrah-e-Pakistan Commemorative – 23 September 1974
 One stamp was issued on this occasion 
 Value: 20 Paisa
 Universal Children's Day – 7 October 1974
 One stamp was issued on this occasion 
 Value: 20 Paisa
 1974 –9 Centenary of U.P.U. – 9 October 1974
 One Souvenir Sheet & Two Stamp were issued on this occasion
 Values: 20 Paisa, Rs. 2.25, Souvenir Sheet Rs. 2.45
 Liaquat Ali Khan's Death Anniversary – 16 October 1974
 One stamp was issued on this occasion 
 Values:  20 Paisa
 Dr. Iqbal Commemoration – 9 November 1974
 One stamp was issued on this occasion 
 Value: 20 Paisa

1975
 Birth Centenary of Dr. Albert Schweitzer – 14 January 1975
 One stamp was issued on this occasion 
 Value:  Rs. 2.25
 South Asia Tourism Commemoration – 15 January 1975
 One stamp was issued on this occasion 
 Value:  Rs. 2.25
 Anniversary of Second Islamic Summit – 22 February 1975
 Two stamps were issued on this occasion 
 Value:  20 Paisa, Rs. 1
 International Women's Year – 15 June 1975
  Two stamps were issued on this occasion 
  Value:  20 Paisa, Rs. 2.25
 International Congress of Mathematical Sciences – 14 July 1975
  One stamp was issued on this occasion 
  Value:  20 Paisa
 11th Anniversary of R.C.D. – 21 July 1975
  Three stamps were issued on this occasion 
 Values:  20 Paisa, 60 Paisa, Rs. 1.25
 Tree Plantation Day – 9 August 1975
  One stamp was issued on this occasion 
  Value:  20 Paisa
 Wildlife Series (1) – 30 September 1975
  Two stamps were issued on this occasion 
  Value:  20 Paisa, Rs. 2.25
  Universal Children’s Day – 6 October 1975
  One stamp was issued on this occasion 
  Value:  20 Paisa
  700th Anniversary of Amir Khusrau – 24 October 1975
  Two stamps were issued on this occasion 
  Values:  20 Paisa, Rs. 2.25
 Dr. Mohammad Iqbal Commemorative – 9 November 1975
  One stamp was issued on this occasion 
  Value:  20 Paisa
 Wildlife Series (2) – 31 December 1975
  Two stamps were issued on this occasion 
  Values:  20 Paisa, Rs. 3

1976
 Save Mohenjadaro Series – 29 February 1975
  Five stamps in a se-tenant Gutter sheet were issued on this occasion 
 Values:  10 Paisa, 20 Paisa, 65 Paisa, Rs. 3, Rs. 4
  International Seerat Congress – 3 March 1976
 Two stamps were issued on this occasion 
  Values:  20 Paisa, Rs. 3
 Centenary of First Telephone Transmission – 10 March 1976
  One stamp was issued on this occasion 
  Value:  Rs. 3
 Centenary of National College of Arts, Lahore – 15 March 1976
 One stamp was issued on this occasion 
 Value:  20 Paisa
 Wildlife Series (3) – 31 March 1976
  Two stamps were issued on this occasion 
  Values:  20 Paisa, Rs. 3
 World Health Day – 7 April 1976
 One stamp was issued on this occasion 
 Value:  20 Paisa
 Save Mohenjadaro Series – 31 May 1976
 One stamp was issued on this occasion 
 Value: 20 Paisa
 American Revolution Bicentennial – 4 July 1976
 Two stamps were issued on this occasion 
 Values:  90 Paisa, Rs. 4
  Wildlife Series (4) – 12 July 1976
 Two stamps were issued on this occasion 
 Values:  20 Paisa, Rs. 3
 12th Anniversary of R.C.D. – 21 July 1976
  Three stamps were issued on this occasion 
  Values:  20 Paisa, 60 p, 90 p
 Quaid-i-Azam 100th Anniversary Commemorative – 14 August 1976
  Eight stamps in a se-tenant block of 8 were issued on this occasion 
  Values:  5 Paisa, 10 Paisa, 15 Paisa, 20 Paisa, 40 Paisa, 50 Paisa, Rs. 1, Rs. 3
 Mohenjadaro Series(3) – 31 August 1976
 One stamp was issued on this occasion 
 Value:  65 Paisa
 Combat Racial Discrimination Commemorative – 15 September 1976
 One stamp was issued on this occasion 
 Value: 65 Paisa
 Universal Children's Day– 4 October 1976
 One stamp was issued on this occasion 
 Value:  20 Paisa
 Muhammad Iqbal Centenary Commemorative – 9 November 1976
 One stamp was issued on this occasion 
 Value:  20 Paisa
 Quaid-e-Azam Centenary Scout Jamboree
  One stamp was issued on this occasion 
  Value: 20 Paisa
 Children's Literature – 15 December 1976
  One stamp was issued on this occasion 
  Value: 20 Paisa
 Quaid-i-Azam Birth Centenary – 25 December 1976
  One stamp was issued on this occasion 
  First time in Pakistan a gold stamp was issued. Each stamp contains 25 mg of 23/24 carat gold
  Printed by De Carter SA Paris, France
  Officially A Imperf Sheet of 10 Stamps and a presentation sheet with one stamp in the centre were issued
  Value:  Rs. 10

References
Collect Pakistan Postage Stamps Stamps Catalogue. The First Catalogue on Pakistan Stamps 1947–2009.Ist Edition 1975.

1967